Tantia Tope (also spelled Tatya Tope, : [t̪aːt̪ʲa ʈoːpe]; 16 February 1814 — 18 April 1859) was a notable mutineer in the Indian Rebellion of 1857.

Born as Ramachandra Panduranga Yewalkar to a Marathi Deshastha Brahmin family, in Yeola, (near Nasik). Tantia took on the title Tope, meaning commanding officer. His first name Tantia means General. A personal adherent of Nana Saheb of Bithoor, he progressed with the Gwalior contingent after the British reoccupied Kanpur (then known as Cawnpore) and forced General Windham to retreat from the city. Later on, Tantia Tope came to the relief of Rani Lakshmibai of Jhansi and with her seized the city of Gwalior. However, he was defeated by General Napier's British Indian troops at Ranod and after a further defeat at Sikar, he abandoned the campaign.

According to an official statement, Tantia Tope's father was Panduranga Yewalkar and his mother was Rukhma Bai. Tope was a Maraṭha Vashista Brahman by birth. In a government letter, he was said to be the minister of Baroda, while he was held identical to Nana Saheb in another communication. A witness at his trial described Tantia Tope as "a man of middling stature, with a wheat complexion and always wearing a white chukri-dar turban".

Tope was executed by the British Government at Sipri (now Shivpuri) on 18 April 1859.

Initial engagement at the Indian rebellion of 1857
After the rebellion in Cawnpore (Kanpur) broke out on 5 June 1857, Nana Saheb became the leader of the rebels. 
When the British forces at Cawnpore surrendered on 25 June 1857, Nana was declared Peshwa in late June. After a defeat, Nana's troops had to withdraw to Bithur, after which Havelock crossed the Ganges and retreated to Awadh. Tantia Tope began to act in Nana Saheb's name from Bithur.

Tantia Tope was one of the leaders of the massacre of Cawnpore, which occurred on 27 June 1857. Afterwards, Tope held a good defensive position until he was driven out by the British force on 16 July 1857. Afterward, he defeated General Cyrill in the Second Battle of Cawnpore, which started on 19 November 1857 and continued for seventeen days. Tope and his army were defeated when the British counterattacked under Sir Colin Campbell. Tope and other rebels fled the scene and had to take shelter with the Rani of Jhansi, while aiding her as well.

Clash with Colonel Holmes
Later on Tantia and Rao Saheb, after assisting Jhansi during the British assault successfully helped Rani Lakshmibai escape the attack. Together with Rani Lakshmibai, they took control of Gwalior Fort declaring Hindavi Swaraj (Free Kingdom) under the name of Nana Saheb Peshwa from Gwalior. After losing Gwalior to the British, Tope and Rao Saheb, nephew of Nana Saheb, fled to the Rajputana. He was able to induce the army of Tonk to join him.

Tope was unable to enter the town of Bundi though, and while announcing he would go south, he headed west in reality and towards Nimach. A British flying column commanded by Colonel Holmes was in pursuit of him, while the British commander in Rajputana, General Abraham Robert was able to attack the rebel force when they had reached a position between Sanganer and Bhilwara. Tope again fled from the field towards Udaipur and, after visiting a Hindu shrine on 13 August, he drew up his forces on the Banas River. They were defeated again by Roberts's forces and Tope fled again. He crossed the Chambal River and reached the town of Jhalrapatan in the State of Jhalawar.

Continued resistance

Even after the Revolt of 1857 was put down by the British, Tantia Tope continued resistance as a guerrilla fighter in the jungles. He induced the state forces to rebel against the Raja and was able to replace the artillery he had lost at the Banas River. Tope then took his forces towards Indore, but was pursued by the British, now commanded by General John Michel as he fled towards Sironj. 
Tope, accompanied by Rao Saheb, decided to divide their combined forces so that he could make his way to Chanderi with a bigger force, and Rao Saheb, on the other hand, with a smaller force to Jhansi. However, they combined again in October and suffered yet another defeat at Chhota Udaipur.

By January 1859, they arrived to the state of Jaipur and experienced two more defeats. At this point, he met Man Singh, Raja of Narwar, and his household and decided to stay with at his court. Man Singh was in dispute with the Maharaja of Gwalior while the British were successful in negotiating with him to hand Tope to them in return for his life and protection of his family from any reprisals by the Maharaja. After this event, Tope was handed to the British and left to face his fate.

Execution
Tantia Tope admitted the charges brought before him, but noted that he might be held accountable only before his master, the Peshwa. He was executed on 18 April 1859 at Sipri.

See also
Bahadur Shah II
Begum Hazrat Mahal
Nana Sahib
Rani of Jhansi

Notes

References

Bibliography

Further reading
 
 Parag Tope (2010). Operation Red Lotus. 

1814 births
1859 deaths
Executed Indian people
People executed by British India by hanging
People from Nashik district
Indian generals
Revolutionaries of the Indian Rebellion of 1857
Indian independence activists from Maharashtra
Indian independence armed struggle activists